Dylan William Strome (born March 7, 1997) is a Canadian professional ice hockey center for the Washington Capitals of the National Hockey League.  Ahead of the 2015 NHL Entry Draft, Strome was considered a top prospect, and was selected third overall by the Arizona Coyotes. He has also played for the Chicago Blackhawks.

Playing career

Junior
Strome started to gain attention as a minor midget hockey player with the Toronto Marlboros of the Greater Toronto Hockey League (GTHL), where he was named the league's Player of the Year for the 2012–13 season.

Strome was drafted second overall by the Ontario Hockey League (OHL)'s Erie Otters in the 2013 OHL Priority Selection, and played with the Otters for four seasons, beginning with the 2013–14 OHL season. On March 25, 2015, Strome won the 2015 OHL scoring title (129 points), narrowly beating-out fellow 2015 NHL Entry Draft prospect Mitch Marner (126 points). Erie teammate and eventual NHL first overall draft pick Connor McDavid (120 points), who missed 21 games, finished third. Along with winning the scoring title, Strome set the Otters' team record for most points in a single season, narrowly edging former linemate Connor Brown. On May 22, 2017, in the Memorial Cup round robin, Strome scored a tournament single-game record seven points (four goals and three assists), leading the Otters to a 12–5 win over the Saint John Sea Dogs.

Professional

Arizona Coyotes
Strome was drafted third overall by the Arizona Coyotes in the 2015 NHL Entry Draft. On July 6, 2015, he signed a three-year, NHL entry-level contract with Arizona.

In his NHL debut, on October 18, 2016, Strome collected his first NHL point. On November 20, the Coyotes announced Strome would be sent back to the Erie Otters of the OHL.

During the 2017–18 season, Strome made the Coyotes' final roster out of training camp. On October 9, 2017, the Coyotes announced Strome was being sent down to the Coyotes' American Hockey League (AHL) affiliate, the Tucson Roadrunners, after going pointless in two games. However, he was recalled on November 26 after recording a seven-game point streak with the Roadrunners. He scored his first NHL goal on December 2 in a 5–0 win over the New Jersey Devils. Despite this early success, on December 19, 2017, Strome was demoted to the AHL after Arizona's acquisition of Josh Archibald from the Pittsburgh Penguins. On January 4, 2018, Strome was selected for the 2018 AHL All-Star Classic Game. Strome was recalled to the NHL on March 20, 2018, where he played, and scored, in a game against the Buffalo Sabres on March 21. On April 4, it was announced that Strome was voted in by coaches, media and players to play on the AHL All-Rookie Team. On April 8, 2018, after the Coyotes failed to make the 2018 Stanley Cup playoffs, Strome was sent down to the AHL to help the Roadrunners in their Calder Cup playoff run.

Chicago Blackhawks
Strome started the 2018–19 season on the Coyotes' NHL roster. After playing in 20 games, on November 25, 2018, he was traded to the Chicago Blackhawks (along with Brendan Perlini) in exchange for Nick Schmaltz. Strome was placed on a line with former OHL teammate Alex DeBrincat and Perlini and played on the team's power play unit. On February 11, 2019, Strome was named the Third Star of the Week after scoring two goals and five assists in three games to help the Blackhawks win seven games in a row. He finished the season with 17 goals and 34 assists for the Blackhawks.

On January 3, 2021, the Blackhawks signed Strome to a two-year, $6 million contract.

Strome was a healthy scratch for 7 of the first 11 games of the 2021–22 NHL season. Following the dismissal of coach Jeremy Colliton, Strome rebounded and saw more playtime with the Blackhawks as a top-six forward. He finished the season with 22 goals, 26 assists with 52.3 face off percentage.

As an impending restricted free agent at the conclusion of the season, Strome was not tendered a qualifying offer by the rebuilding Blackhawks, and was released to free agency on July 12, 2022.

Washington Capitals
On July 14, 2022, Strome signed a one-year, $3.5 million contract with the Washington Capitals. He then signed a five-year, $25 million contract extension with the Capitals on February 3, 2023.

International play

As a 16-year-old, Strome competed as a member of Canada Ontario at the 2014 World U-17 Hockey Challenge, where he was recognized for his outstanding performance when he was named to the tournament's All-Star Team.

Strome went on to play for Canada at the 2014 Ivan Hlinka Memorial Tournament, winning a gold medal.

At the 2016 IIHF World Junior Championships held in Helsinki, Strome and Mitch Marner each scored four goals and two assists in five games to lead the Canadian team in scoring. Canada reached the quarter-finals but was eliminated by Finland.

Strome returned to the 2017 World Junior Ice Hockey Championships held in Toronto and Montreal, where he captained Canada to a silver medal finish.

On April 29, 2019, Strome was named to the Team Canada roster for the 2019 IIHF World Championship. He helped Canada progress through to the playoff rounds before losing the final to Finland and finishing with the silver medal on May 26, 2019. Strome finished the tournament with 1 goal and 5 points in 10 games.

Personal life
Strome is the younger brother of Anaheim Ducks forward Ryan Strome and the older brother of Washington Capitals prospect Matthew Strome. The Strome brothers grew up in the Lorne Park neighbourhood in Mississauga, Ontario. On March 28, 2021, Strome's wife Tayler Strome gave birth to the couple's first child, Weslie Margaret Strome.

Career statistics

Regular season and playoffs

International

Awards and honours

References

External links
 
 

1997 births
Living people
Arizona Coyotes draft picks
Arizona Coyotes players
Chicago Blackhawks players
Canadian ice hockey centres
Erie Otters players
Ice hockey people from Ontario
National Hockey League first-round draft picks
Sportspeople from Mississauga
Tucson Roadrunners players
Washington Capitals players